Early Flight is a 1974 compilation album by the American psychedelic rock band Jefferson Airplane, released as Grunt CYL1-0437. It features previously unreleased material from 1966, 1967, and 1970 as well as both sides of a non-album 1970 single.

The first three tracks come from the recording sessions for Jefferson Airplane Takes Off which took place in December, 1965 at RCA Victor's Music Center of the World recording studio in Hollywood. These tracks feature vocals by Signe Toly Anderson and Skip Spence on drums. "Runnin' 'Round This World" had been previously released as a B-side on the "It's No Secret" single.

The closing two tracks on side one and the first track from side two come from the recording sessions for Surrealistic Pillow, which took place from October through November, 1966 at RCA Victor's Music Center of the World. Tracks from the "Takes Off" and "Surrealistic Pillow" sessions appeared later as bonus tracks on the respective 2003 remasters, albeit with different mixes.

"Up or Down" comes from the early recording sessions for Bark which took place in February 1970 at Pacific High and Wally Heider Studios before Marty Balin chose to leave the band.  "Mexico" and "Have You Seen the Saucers?" had been previously released as a non-album single in 1970, but this was the first LP on which the two songs appeared.

Track listing

Personnel
Jefferson Airplane
Marty Balin – guitar, vocals
Paul Kantner – rhythm guitar, vocals
Jorma Kaukonen – lead guitar, vocals
Jack Casady – bass
Grace Slick – vocals on "J. P. P. McStep B. Blues", "Go to Her", "Mexico" and "Have You Seen the Saucers", piano on "Mexico" and "Have You Seen the Saucers"
Spencer Dryden – drums on "In the Morning", "J. P. P. McStep B. Blues", "Go to Her", "Mexico" and "Have You Seen the Saucers"
Signe Toly Anderson – vocals on "High Flying Bird", "Runnin' Round This World" and "It's Alright"
Skip Spence – drums on "High Flying Bird", "Runnin' Round This World", "It's Alright" and "J. P. P. McStep B. Blues"
Joey Covington – drums on "Up or Down", congas and bells on "Have You Seen the Saucers"
Additional Personnel
Jerry Garcia – guitar on "In the Morning" and "J. P. P. McStep B. Blues"
John Paul Hammond – harmonica on "In the Morning"

References

Notes

Jefferson Airplane compilation albums
1974 compilation albums
Albums recorded at Wally Heider Studios
Grunt Records compilation albums